Pseudabacetus is a genus of beetles in the family Carabidae, containing the following species:

 Pseudabacetus parallelus Straneo, 1954
 Pseudabacetus securipalpis Burgeon, 1935

References

Pterostichinae